Battlefields (1939) is a collection of poetry by Australian poet Mary Gilmore.

The collection consists of 124 poems, the majority of which are published for the first time in this volume.

Contents

Reviews
The Courier-Mail noted the publication of the collection in an editorial, stating: "This delightful book, with its six score poems and one, proves that the well of poetry in her heart has not dried up, and if they have not all been drawn from that fountain within the last lustrum (though many are quite recent) they are all well worth preserving. These pages, as might be expected, have the wistfulness of an aftermath garnered at eventide and tinged with the light of sunset...Her ear has never been dulled to "the still, sad music of humanity" by the glitter and clatter of this swiftly-moving age."

The Cambridge Guide to Women's Writing in English noted that the collection "maintains earlier ambivalences towards warfare, but the balance here is less towards praising the heroism of war's soldiers ("For Anzac (1939)") and more toward attacking those addressed in "To the War-Mongers"...In a wider sense, however, Gilmore engages with other social and political battlefields."

Notes
 Dedication: To Hugh McCrae and Raynor Hoff

References

1939 poetry books
Australian poetry collections
Angus & Robertson books